Katherine Bernhardt (born 1975; Clayton, Missouri) is an artist based in St. Louis, Missouri.

Work and career
Bernhardt received her MFA from the School of Visual Arts, New York, and her Bachelor of Fine Arts (BFA) from the School of the Art Institute of Chicago, Illinois.

Bernhardt is known for painting consumer symbols, tropical animals, and every day objects over bright flat fields of color in an expressionistic and almost abstract style. Previous bodies of work include Moroccan rug-inspired paintings and collages made in collaborations with her (now ex)husband Youssef Jdia,<ref>{{cite news|title=Smith, Roberta. Katherine Bernhardt and Youssef Jdia: 'Holiday Services|work=The New York Times |date=21 November 2013 |url=https://www.nytimes.com/2013/11/22/arts/design/katherine-bernhardt-and-youssef-jdia-holiday-services.html|last1=Smith |first1=Roberta }}</ref> as well as her "model" paintings, which were loose portraits based on images of supermodels from high fashion magazines.

Bernhardt has also been involved in numerous collaborations within the art and fashion industries. In 2015, Bernhardt was one of five artists asked to contribute to W Magazine's annual "Art Issue" featuring artwork inspired by rapper Drake. Bernhardt also produced a in-store installation in a New York City Chanel location for the launch of the J-12 watch.  She has also collaborated with Flaunt magazine, EDUN, and Miss Sixty.

Exhibitions
Katherine Bernhardt's work has been exhibited internationally since 2000. She has been included in both solo and group shows with galleries such as CANADA, the Hole, Team Gallery, VENUS, China Art Objects Galleries, V1 Gallery, Gavin Brown's Enterprise and Xavier Hufkens.

Selected solo exhibitions2020 DONE WITH XANAX, Canada, New York, NY2019 Big in Japan, NANZUKA, Tokyo, Japan
 Garfield on Scotch Tape, Xavier Hufkens, Brussels, Belgium
 GOLD, Art OMI, New York, NY2018Watermelon World, Mario Testino Museum, Lima, Peru 
CANADA, New York, NY, USA2017Karma, Amagansett, NY, USA

Concrete Jungle Jungle Love, Lever House, New York, NY, USA

Modern Art Museum, Fort Worth, TX, USA

Contemporary Art Museum, St Louis, MO, USA2016Product Recall: New Pattern Paintings, Xavier Hufkens, Brussels, Belgium2015Strawberry Banana Power Smoothie, Carl Freedman Gallery, London, UK

Pablo and Efrain, Venus Over Manhattan, New York, New York

Fruit Salad, Venus Over Los Angeles, Los Angeles, California

Club Caribe, Cidra, Puerto Rico (Permanent installation)2014Doritos and Diet Coke, China Art Objects Galleries, Los Angeles, CA
           
Stupid, Crazy, Ridiculous, Funny Patterns, CANADA, NY, New York2013Watermelon, Smiley Faces, Ice Cream, Popsicles, Avocado and Sun, Roberto Paradise, San Juan Puerto Rico
            
Holiday Services: Katherine Bernhardt and Youssef Jdia, The Hole, NYC, NY2012Nomad, Loyal Gallery, Malmo, Sweden2011Rites of Spring Passage, Carbon 12, Dubai, United Arab Emirates2010Hot Pop Time Machine, V1 Gallery, Copenhagen, Denmark

Tombouctou 52 Jours, CANADA, New York, NY

Lila Dit Ca, Galerie Suzanne Tarasieve, Paris, France2009Super Models and Swatch Watches, Galeria Marta Cervera, Madrid, Spain

Wonder Women, Carbon 12, Dubai

Greeky, Ransom, London, UK

Kate, Giselle, Natalia, Agyness, Simon, Kanye and George, CANADA, New  York2007Drunken Hot Girls, Galerie Suzanne Tarasieve, Paris France

Kiss Me Kate, LOYAL, Stockholm, Sweden

Black White Silver Gold Baby, installation with CHANEL and New York Magazine, CHANEL 64th and Madison Avenue, NY, New York

La Dolce Vita, Galeria Glance, Torino, Italy

Flesh for Fantasy, Patricia Low Contemporary, Gstaad, Switzerland

Girls on Film, Cannes, France

Budapest, The Gellert Hotel, 10:15pm, Galerie Lisa Ruyter, Vienna, Austria

Winter Special Crazy Fun, Galerie Suzanne Tarasieve, Paris, France200596 Degrees in the Shade, CANADA, New York

Women of the Forest, Greener Pastures Gallery, Toronto, Canada

Where the Spirits Dwell, Galeria Comercial, San Juan, Puerto Rico2004Pleasure and Paint, Galerie Lisa Ruyter, Vienna, Austria2003'''Dots, Team Gallery, New York

Selected group exhibitions

Bernhardt has been included in group exhibitions with Gavin Brown's Enterprise (Call and Response, 2015; Drunk or Stoned, 2004), Zach Feuer Gallery (Don't Look Now, 2014), V1 Gallery (Independents, 2013; Tonight We Won't Be Bored, 2012; The New Yorkers, 2009), The Hole (Early Man, 2014; Chicken or Beef, 2013), and CANADA (Spaced Out/On Time, 2009; New York's Finest, 2005; Slacker Art, Unfinished On Purpose, 2003).

Public collections 

Alberto de la Cruz Foundation, Puerto Rico
Brant Foundation, Greenwich, CT
Carnegie Museum, Pittsburgh, PA
Mohammad and Mahera Abu Ghazaleh Foundation, Amman, Jordan
High Museum, Atlanta, GA
Hall Collection, Reading, VT
Rubell Collection, Miami, FL
Smithsonian – Hirshhorn Museum, Washington D.C.
Portland Museum of Art, Portland, ME
San Antonio Museum of Art, San Antonio, TX
Sandretto Foundation, Torino, Italy

Publications

Bernhardt, Katherine, et al. The Magnificent Excess of Snoop Dogg – Katherine Bernhardt''. PictureBox, 2008.

References

External links
Katherine Bernhardt on Xavier Hufkens.com
Katherine Bernhardt on ArtNet.com
Images, biography and texts from the Saatchi Gallery
Further information from CANADA New York
Katherine Bernhard on ArtFacts.net

1975 births
Living people
People from St. Louis County, Missouri
Artists from New York (state)
School of Visual Arts alumni
School of the Art Institute of Chicago alumni
People from St. Louis